The women's doubles Tournament at the 2007 İstanbul Cup took place between 21 and 26 May on outdoor clay courts in İstanbul, Turkey. Agnieszka and Urszula Radwańska won the title, defeating Chan Yung-jan and Sania Mirza in the final.

Seeds

Draw

References

Main Draw

Istanbul Cup - Doubles
İstanbul Cup